Dome Thong (lit: Golden Dome; English title: The Dome of Mystery
) is a Thai television series or lakorn. It remake from a 1999 lakorn of the same name (lead role by Sarunyu Wongkrachang).

Summary
Virongrong or Plubplung (a lily flower in Thai language) is a Bangkok girl. Those who graduated from the United States traveled to the Dome Thong, a large mansion far away. It is a very large place. However, there was a mysterious and horrible location and the people who lived here were all bizarre. At the night she saw a mystery man wearing tuxedos riding a carriage, he parked in front of her bedroom window, and pointing up on the dome. After that, every full moon night, besides this man will appear at the same place, she also hears the creepy Thai music from the dome.

Virongrong search for truth on her own. Although there is a prohibition that prohibits up the top dome decisively. Before she know it, the truth of all the weird things is sad after all, and it relates to her past.

Cast
Main cast
Tussaneeya Karnsomnuch as Virongrong (present) and Plubplung (past) (first her lead role)
Veeraparb Suparbpaiboon as Adit Sirodom or Khun Rop (present) and Chao Phraya Sorasak Krai Narong (past)
Duangdao Jarujinda as Than Phu Ying Montha Sirodom (present)
Chawallakorn Wanthanapisitkul as Saengkae 
Gavintra Photijak as Usa
Karnklao Duaysianklao as Pinthong
Borvornpoch Jaikunta as Aniruth 
Phoomphadit Nittayaros as Phansoon 
Supporting cast
Pichayadon Peungphan as Pitch
Weerakaniz Karnwatanagool as Chao Phuthi
Kawita Rodkerd as Chao Lanna
Kanjana Jindawat as Suraphee
Noi Po-ngam as Urai
Vajira Peamsuriya as Ob-om
Ampha Poosith as Nang Pis 
Runglawan Thonahongsa as Buakam
Krailad Kriangkrai as Nai Som
Passorn Boonyakiart as Khun Ying Kaew
 Tin Settachoke as Hr.Poj
Cameo appearances
Chiranan Manochaem as Than Phu Ying Sorasak Krai Narong or Than Phu Ying Montha Sirodom in the past
Prab Yuttapichai as Nai Prom
Porjade Kaenpetch as Nai Phan
Kanjanaporn Plodpai as Khun Prang

See more
Phi Tai Hong

References

External links
  
 Official trailer

Thai television soap operas
2013 Thai television series debuts
2013 Thai television series endings
Thai mystery television series
Supernatural television series
Channel 7 (Thailand) original programming